Dean Moyar is an American philosopher and professor of philosophy at Johns Hopkins University. 
He is known for his expertise on Kant and German Idealism.

Books
 Hegel's Value: Justice as the Living Good (OUP, 2021)
 The Oxford Handbook of Hegel (ed.) (OUP, 2017)
 Hegel's Conscience (OUP, 2011)
 The Routledge Companion to Nineteenth Century Philosophy (ed.) (2010), 
 Hegel's Phenomenology of Spirit: A Critical Guide (ed.) (CUP, 2008)

References

External links
 Dean Moyar at Johns Hopkins University

21st-century American philosophers
Political philosophers
Hegel scholars
Kant scholars
Philosophy academics
University of Chicago alumni
Johns Hopkins University faculty
Living people
German–English translators
Date of birth missing (living people)
Year of birth missing (living people)